Radostice is a municipality and village in Brno-Country District in the South Moravian Region of the Czech Republic. It has about 800 inhabitants.

Notable people
Ladislav Pazdera (born 1936), gymnast
Martin Havelka (1958–2020), actor; lived here

References

Villages in Brno-Country District